Ectenosaurus is an extinct genus of marine lizard belonging to the mosasaur family. It is classified as part of the Plioplatecarpinae subfamily alongside genera like Angolasaurus and Platecarpus. Ectenosaurus is known from the Santonian and Campanian of Kansas, Alabama, and Texas.

The generic name means "Drawn-out lizard", from Greek ectenes ("drawn-out") and Greek sauros ("lizard") referencing the elongated muzzle.

Description 

It was a rare genus of mosasaur with several unique characteristics that clearly separate it from other mosasaur genera. The most prominent of these features is its elongated jaws, elongated in a similar vein to other mosasaurs with elongated jaws, such as Plotosaurus and Pluridens.

Russell (1967) considered the form of the teeth, the shape of the frontal and the large suprastapedial process of the quadrate as evidence of a close relation between Ectenosaurus and Platecarpus. He separated Ectenosaurus from Platecarpus based on the elongated snout, the exclusion of the prefrontals from the narial borders and the fusion of the supra- and infrastepedial processes.

Scales and locomotion 
The specimen FHSM VP-401 preserve significantly comprehensive skin impressions from Ectenosaurus, which makes it possible to draw conclusions not only about mosasaur integument at large but also about mosasaur movement and propulsion. The scales are considerably smaller in size (2.7×2.0 mm) than those found in the famed LACM 128319 specimen of Platecarpus (3.8×4.4 mm), despite the animals being of similar sizes.

The combination of small and firmly anchored body scales as well as a complex meshwork of alternating crossed-helical and longitudinal fiber bundles suggest that the anterior torso of Ectenosaurus was reasonably stiff. This also suggests that this section of the body was quite rigid during locomotion, and that the main form of propulsion would have to have been done by the tail (likely possessing a tail fin like other mosasaur species), and that it could not move by undulating its entire body like snakes do, a previously popular view of mosasaur locomotion.

History of discovery 
Ectenosaurus was originally described as a species of Platecarpus, P. clidastoides, in 1894. The type specimen was collected by C.H. Sternberg or G. Bauer from Logan County in Kansas and was housed in the Bayerische Staatssammlung fur Palaontologie in Munich, where it was likely destroyed during the Second World War. A second specimen (which was also much better preserved) was discovered by George Sternberg in 1953, which he initially identified as a Clidastes velox.

This specimen was then exhibited at the Sternberg Memorial Museum on the campus of Fort Hays State University from its discovery until 1999 when the museum was closed and moved. Since the museum moved, the specimen remains in storage, where it is catalogued as FHSM VP-401. It was examined in 1963 by Dale A. Russell who determined that it represented a Platecarpus clidastoides and not a Clidastes velox. In his Systematics and Morphology of American Mosasaurs (1967) he re-described the species as part of a new genus, Ectenosaurus. Russell also assigned several additional specimens to Ectenosaurus clidastoides, namely YPM 4671, 4672, 4673, and 4674 in the Yale Peabody Museum.

In 2021, Alexander Willman, Takuya Konishi, and Michael Caldwell designated FHSM VP-401 as the neotype of E. clidastoides, as a replacement for the type specimen. They also named another mosasaur specimen discovered in Logan County during the 1970s, catalogued as FHSM VP-5515, as a new species of Ectenosaurus, Ectenosaurus everhartorum. This species was named after marine reptile researchers Mike Everhart and Pamela Everhart. Since they could not be differentiated, the YPM specimens were removed by Willman and colleagues from E. clidastoides and considered as Ectenosaurus sp.

Classification 
Ectenosaurus has been seen as a plioplatecarpine for most of the time since its discovery, partly due to long having been classified as a species of Platecarpus. Some analyses recover it as a mosasaurine however, sharing close relations with Prognathodon.
The cladogram below follows Simões et al. (2017), collapsed to only display the Plioplatecarpinae, and shows Ectenosaurus in relation to other plioplatecarpines.

References 

Mosasaurs of North America
Fossil taxa described in 1967
Taxa named by Dale Russell
Mosasaurids
Santonian genus first appearances
Campanian genus extinctions